The Third Sarpy County Courthouse is a historic building in Papillion, Nebraska, and the former courthouse of Sarpy County. It was built by John L. Soderberg in 1922–1923, and designed in the Classical Revival style by architect William F. Gernandt. Two other courthouses had been built for the county prior to this one: the first one was the Fontenelle Bank in Bellevue, followed by a second one in Papillion. A fourth courthouse replaced this building in 1974, and it became a city hall and public library. It has been listed on the National Register of Historic Places since July 5, 1990.

References

National Register of Historic Places in Sarpy County, Nebraska
Neoclassical architecture in Nebraska
Government buildings completed in 1923
1923 establishments in Nebraska
Courthouses on the National Register of Historic Places in Nebraska